Hotchkiss may refer to:

Places

Canada 
 Hotchkiss, Alberta
 Hotchkiss, Calgary

United States 
 Hotchkiss, Colorado
 Hotchkiss, Virginia
 Hotchkiss, West Virginia

Business and industry
 Hotchkiss (car), a French automobile manufacturer
 Hotchkiss et Cie, a French armaments manufacturer
 Hotchkiss Ordnance Company, an English armaments manufacturer

Military
 Hotchkiss H35, a French tank of World War II
 Hotchkiss gun
 Hotchkiss machine gun, including a list of variants
 Hotchkiss M201, a French light transport vehicle

Other uses
 Hotchkiss (surname)
 Hotchkiss drive, a form of automobile power transmission and suspension.
 Hotchkiss Bicycle Railroad in Smithville, Burlington County, New Jersey, U.S.
 Hotchkiss School, a private school in Lakeville, Connecticut, U.S.
 Rebecca Hotchkiss, a character on the NBC/DirecTV daytime drama Passions

See also
 Hodgkin, a surname